Trevor Fitzpatrick (born 19 February 1980) is an English-born-Irish footballer who played as a forward for Southend United, Shelbourne and Bohemians. He represented the Republic of Ireland at the UEFA U-19 Championship in Sweden in 1999 where he won a bronze medal after scoring in the group stages.

He made his debut for Southend United in a Second Division match, in the 2–1 home defeat at Luton Town on 3 January 1998, coming on as a substitute in the 67th minute for Pepe N'Diaye.

References

External links 

Living people
1980 births
English footballers
Republic of Ireland association footballers
Southend United F.C. players
Shelbourne F.C. players
Bohemian F.C. players
English Football League players
League of Ireland players
Association football forwards